Momčilo Gavrić may refer to:

Momčilo Gavrić (1906–1993), youngest soldier in World War I
Momčilo Gavrić (footballer) (1938–2010), Yugoslav and American footballer